The Primetime Emmy Award for Outstanding Talk Series is an award presented to the best television variety-style talk show of the year.

In 2015, Outstanding Variety Series was separated into two categories – Outstanding Variety Sketch Series and Outstanding Variety Talk Series.

In 2023, the category will be renamed Outstanding Talk Series.

Winners and nominations
Outstanding Variety Talk Series

2010s

2020s

Outstanding Talk Series

Programs with multiple wins
Totals include wins for Outstanding Variety Series.

11 wins
 The Daily Show with Jon Stewart

7 wins
 Last Week Tonight with John Oliver

6 wins
 Late Show with David Letterman

2 wins
 The Colbert Report

Programs with multiple nominations
Totals include nominations for Outstanding Variety Series.

17 nominations
 Late Show with David Letterman

15 nominations
 The Daily Show with Jon Stewart

12 nominations
 Real Time with Bill Maher

11 nominations
 Jimmy Kimmel Live!

10 nominations
 The Colbert Report

8 nominations
 Last Week Tonight with John Oliver

6 nominations
 The Late Show with Stephen Colbert

5 nominations
 The Daily Show with Trevor Noah

4 nominations
 Full Frontal with Samantha Bee
 The Late Late Show with James Corden

3 nominations
 The Tonight Show Starring Jimmy Fallon

2 nominations
 Conan

See also
 Critics' Choice Television Award for Best Talk Show

References

Talk Series
Awards established in 2015
Awards disestablished in 2020